Apamea cristata is a moth of the  family Noctuidae. It is found in the northeastern United States, including Michigan, New Hampshire, Maryland, New York, and Pennsylvania. In Canada it is found in Quebec and New Brunswick.

The wingspan is about 42 mm.

External links
Image
Moths of Maryland

Apamea (moth)
Moths of North America
Moths described in 1878
Taxa named by Augustus Radcliffe Grote